Ron Jones (18 June 1914 – 20 March 2010) was a Welsh footballer who played as a defender. He played in the football league for Wrexham and Liverpool. He also guested for Crewe Alexandra during the war.

References

External links
 LFC History profile

1914 births
2010 deaths
Welsh footballers
Liverpool F.C. players
Wrexham A.F.C. players
Association football defenders